This is a list of past and present Coventry City players who have been capped by their country whilst at the club.

International footballers

Footnotes
A. Years when the player had been capped by their country whilst at Coventry City.
B. Jackie Brown represented both the Irish Football Association and the Football Association of Ireland while both associations claimed jurisdiction over the whole of Ireland.

References

External links
Coventry City players who have been capped for Scotland
NATIONAL TEAMS → appearances of Coventry City F.C., Coventry players

Internationals
Lists of association football players by club in England
Coventry-related lists
Association football player non-biographical articles
Coventry